State Highway 361 (SH 361) is a state highway in San Patricio and Nueces counties that runs from Gregory in southern Texas, near Corpus Christi, east and south to Padre Island on the Gulf of Mexico coast.

History

The highway was first designated on April 4, 1956 as the  portion of the route from Aransas Pass to Port Aransas, and a 0.7 mile extension in Port Aransas to PR 53 was added to the designation on November 28, 1967. On January 31, 1969 FM 632 from Gregory to Aransas Pass was added to the SH 361 designation. The present route was completed on November 29, 1988 with the designation of PR 53 from Port Aransas to PR 22 on Padre Island as part of SH 361.

Route description
The highway's northern terminus is the intersection with SH 35 and Spur 202 at Gregory in San Patricio County.  The route runs southeast through Ingleside, where it intersects Farm to Market Road 1069, then turns northeast to Aransas Pass. Here the route leaves the Texas mainland and crosses several bridges as it runs in a southeasterly direction through Stedman Island and Harbor Island. The highway is known as Port Aransas Causeway and Cemetery Road for this part of the route.

There is no bridge for the route over the Corpus Christi Channel between Harbor Island and Port Aransas on Mustang Island; a ferry operates at this point. The route takes a southwesterly direction at Port Aransas and runs along the length of Mustang Island. Much of the route crosses Mustang Island State Park, a  tourist and recreational area established by the state in 1979. The highway then crosses the Corpus Christi Pass onto Padre Island, where it ends at a junction with Park Road 22 near the Padre Isles Country Club in Nueces County. The road is paved throughout, except for the ferry at Port Aransas, and is often multi-lane. Much of the highway traverses the picturesque terrain of the Texas barrier islands along the Gulf of Mexico.

Junction list

References

External links
Texas official travel map at the Texas Department of Transportation (Adobe Acrobat format, magnification required for legibility)
Satellite image of SH 361 ferry crossing at Port Aransas at Google Maps
Mustang Island State Park web site

361
Transportation in Nueces County, Texas